Zulfadhmi Suzliman (born 10 February 1996) is a Singaporean footballer who plays as a winger for Singapore Premier League club Tanjong Pagar United.

Club career

Young Lions 
He was named in the squad for the 2016 season where he made 7 appearances for the club.

Tampines Rovers
He signed with the Stag's prime league squad after being released by FAS for the 2017 season.

He was then promoted to the senior squad in the 2018 season. He scored his first professional goal against the defending champions of the Singapore Premier League, Albirex Niigata (S) in May 2018.

Tanjong Pagar United
Zulfadhmi Suzliman joined Tanjong Pagar United on 24 January 2023.

International career

Youth
Zulfadhmi represented Singapore's youth sides, Singapore U16 and U22.

Senior
On 29 August 2018, Zulfadhmi was called up to the senior team by newly appointed head coach, Fandi Ahmad for the friendlies against Mauritius and Fiji. Zulfadhmi made his international debut on 7 September against Mauritius. He started the match and played the full 90 minutes. He made his second appearance for the Lions 4 days later in a 2-0 friendly win against Fiji.

Personal life
Zulfadhmi has two elder brothers, Zulkifli and Zulfadhli and a younger brother Zulqarnaen, all of whom have played in the Singapore Premier League.

Zulfadhmi also had a two year stint as a firefighter.

Career statistics

. Caps and goals may not be correct

International

References 

Singaporean footballers
Association football goalkeepers
Singapore Premier League players
Young Lions FC players
1996 births
Living people
Singapore youth international footballers